Sir Joseph Archer Crowe  (25 October 1825, London – 6 September 1896, Gamburg an der Tauber, today Werbach, Germany) was an English journalist,  consular official and art historian, whose volumes of the History of Painting in Italy, co-written with the Italian critic Giovanni Battista Cavalcaselle (1819–1897), stand at the beginning of disciplined modern art history writing in English, being based on chronologies of individual artists' development and the connoisseurship of identifying artist's individual manners or "hands".

Their multi-volume A New History of Painting in Italy continued to be revised and republished until 1909, after both were dead. Though now outdated, these are still often cited by modern art historians.

Life

Early life
Crowe was born at  141 Sloane Street, London, the son of the journalist Eyre Evans Crowe and his wife Margaret Hunter. Shortly after his birth the family  moved to France, where Crowe's childhood was spent, mostly in Paris, where his father was based as the  correspondent of the London Morning Chronicle; his home was the centre of a liberal and artistic circle that mixed French and expatriates.

At an early age  Crowe showed considerable aptitude for painting and entered the studio of Paul Delaroche in Paris,   with his brother  Eyre Crowe, who was to become a painter of historical genre subjects, and the friend and amanuensis of William Makepeace Thackeray.

Journalism
He returned to England with his father in 1843, following him into journalism as a correspondent for the Morning Chronicle and the Daily News. During the Crimean War he worked as a correspondent for the Illustrated London News. On his return from the Crimea he received an offer to direct an art school in India. He went there, but when the post did not materialise he turned to journalism again, acting as a correspondent for the Times during the Indian Mutiny. Illness cut his time in India short, and he returned to England. He was a correspondent for the Times during the Austro-Italian War in 1858, and was present at the battle of Solferino.

Diplomatic career
Through the influence of Lord John Russell, Crowe was appointed consul-general for Saxony in 1860, and in this capacity he represented French interests at Leipzig during the Franco-Prussian War in 1870.  In 1872 he was appointed consul-general for Westphalia and the Rhenish Provinces in Düsseldorf and in 1880 commercial attaché to the embassies at Berlin and Vienna. In 1882 he was promoted to be commercial attaché for the whole of Europe, based in  Paris. In 1883 he was secretary to the Danube Conference in London; in 1889 plenipotentiary at the Samoa Conference in Berlin and in 1890 British envoy at the Telegraph Congress in Paris.  For these services he was created a C.B. on 14 March 1885, and K.C.M.G on 21 May 1890.

Art historical writing
In 1846, at the suggestion of his father, Crowe began to collect materials for a history of the early Flemish painters. The next year, while travelling between Berlin and Vienna, Crowe made a chance acquaintance with a young Italian art student, Giovanni Battista Cavalcaselle. This acquaintance was renewed later, and cemented into friendship in London, where Cavalcaselle had fled as a political refugee. They decided to collaborate on the work on  Flemish painters, which Crowe had in hand. They visited collections and searched manuscripts together, and no detail was decided until it had been fully debated between them. The text itself was written by Crowe. They went on to collaborate on histories of Italian painting, and monographs on Titian and Raphael.

Family
Crowe married Asta von Barby (c.1841-1908), daughter of Baron Gustav von Barby and Eveline von Ribbentrop, in Gotha, Germany, 11 April 1861. They had three sons, including Sir Eyre Crowe and four daughters.

Death
He died at Schloss Gamburg in Franconia on 6 September 1896.

Publications
With Cavacaselle:

Titian: his Life and Times (in two volumes, 1877)
Raphael: his Life and Works (in two volumes 1883-5)

Crowe also edited Jakob Burckhardt's Cicerone, or Art Guide to Painting in Italy (1873-9), and Kugler's Handbook of Painting: the German, Flemish, and Dutch Schools (1874). 

In 1865 he published an autobiography, Reminiscences of Thirty-five Years of my Life.

Crowe and Cavalcaselle's History of Painting was under revision by Crowe up to the time of his death, and then by Sandford Arthur Strong (died 1904) and Robert Langton Douglas, who brought out first and second volumes of Murray's new six-volume edition in 1903; the third volume, edited by Langton Douglas, appeared in 1909. A reprint of the original edition, brought up to date by annotations by Edward Hutton, was published by Dent in three volumes in 1909.

References

Sources
Attribution:

External links

Brief Cavalcaselle biography

English art historians
1825 births
1896 deaths
Knights Commander of the Order of St Michael and St George
19th-century British journalists
British male journalists
English male non-fiction writers
19th-century male writers
Crowe family